Sage is a grey-green resembling that of dried sage leaves. As a quaternary color, it is an equal mix of the tertiary colors citron and slate. The hex RGB color value of the Sage swatch at right is BCB88A.  For decades, some military flight jackets were made in sage green color.

References

See also
List of colors

Quaternary colors
Shades of green